Deliverin’ is the third album, and first live album, by the American country rock band Poco.  Jim Messina quit the band in October 1970, prior to the release of the album. WBCN DJ Charles Laquidara wrote the liner notes.

Reception
{{Album ratings
| rev1 = Allmusic
| rev1Score = <ref name="AM">
In his Allmusic review, music critic Bruce Eder called the album "About as perfect an album as they ever made and, not coincidentally, by far the biggest seller the early group ever had."

Track listing
“I Guess You Made It” (Richie Furay) – 3:58
“C’mon” (Furay) – 3:10
“Hear That Music” (Timothy B. Schmit) – 3:29
“Kind Woman” (Furay) – 6:07
“Medley: Hard Luck / Child’s Claim To Fame / Pickin Up The Pieces” (Furay, Schmit) – 4:41
“You Better Think Twice” (Jim Messina) – 3:59 (listed as "You'd Better Think Twice")
“A Man Like Me” (Furay) – 4:04
“Medley: Just in Case It Happens, Yes Indeed / Grand Junction / Consequently So Long” (Furay, Rusty Young, Skip Goodwin) – 9:46

Personnel
Poco
Jim Messina — electric and acoustic lead guitar, vocals
Richie Furay — electric and acoustic rhythm guitar, vocals
Rusty Young — steel guitar, dobro, vocals
Timothy B. Schmit — bass, vocals
George Grantham — drums, vocals

Production
Producer: Jim Messina
Recording Engineer: Jim Reeves
Liner notes: Pete Fornatale

References

Poco live albums
1971 live albums
Epic Records live albums
Albums produced by Jim Messina (musician)